Elaunin (Greek verb ἐλαύνω "I steer") is a component of elastic fibers formed from a deposition of elastin between oxytalan fibers. It is found in the periodontal ligament and in the connective tissue of the dermis, particularly in association with sweat glands.

Overview

Identification
Unlike Oxytalan fibres, elaunin fibres stain with orcein, aldehyde fuchsin and resorcin fuchsin without prior oxidation.

Research Findings 
Elaunin fibers have been found within the secretory coil of human eccrine sweat glands.  They were in found in bundles of microtubules which had a different constancy than elastic fibers.  The elaunin fibers found in the secretory coil had a less thicker appearance than that of elastic fibers.

Elaunin can be identified where the fibers of gingival ligament.

There are elastic fibers and one of the main type of elastic fiber is elaunin

In the papillary dermis elaunin is lost when in reduction.

See also
Elastic fibre
https://www.sciencedirect.com/topics/medicine-and-dentistry/elaunin

References

External links

Structural proteins